Ryann Shane (born July 5, 1993) is an American actress best known for her role as Deva Hopewell in the Cinemax series Banshee.

Life and career
Shane grew up with a close relationship with her father. She made her acting debut in 2004, in a short film called Superstore. Shane appeared in Definitely, Maybe alongside Ryan Reynolds in 2008. She played a daughter of an ex-boxer with dementia in the 2011 series Lights Out. In 2012, Shane was cast as Deva Hopewell, the rebellious teenage daughter of Carrie and Gordon Hopewell, in the Cinemax show Banshee. The show ran for four seasons from 2013 to 2016. In 2017, she starred as Deanna Lambert, a teenager whose sex tape with an older boy made her a pariah, in Story of a Girl. Sara Zarr, author of the novel on which the film was based, met with Shane and praised her performance. Shane beat out hundreds of other actresses for the part.

Filmography

Film

Television

References

External links

1993 births
Living people
21st-century American actresses
American child actresses
Place of birth missing (living people)
American film actresses
American television actresses